Thanasimus dubius, known generally as dubious checkered beetle, is a species of checkered beetle in the family Cleridae. Other common names include the American bark beetle destroyer and checkered beetle predator. It is found in Central America and North America.

References

Further reading

External links

 

Clerinae
Articles created by Qbugbot
Beetles described in 1776
Taxa named by Johan Christian Fabricius
Beetles of North America